Marriott Hotels & Resorts is Marriott International's brand of full-service hotels and resorts based in Bethesda, Maryland. As of June 30, 2020, there were 582 hotels and resorts with 205,053 rooms operating under the brand, in addition to 160 hotels with 47,765 rooms planned for development.

History and current operation 
The Marriott chain began with two motels in the 1950s. The first opened as a Quality Inn airport motel near Washington, D.C. and another motel nearby, the Twin Bridges, a few years later. With the opening of the second motel, Marriott was born as a brand name. The Twin Bridges property was demolished in 1990, but the Key Bridge property still operates, but as a full-service hotel.

In 1967, Marriott opened its first resort hotel, Camelback Inn, in Arizona, United States. Marriott Hotels & Resorts expanded outside of the United States for the first time in 1969 with the opening of the Marriott in Acapulco, Mexico.

By 1975, Marriott Hotels & Resorts had expanded to Europe, with the Amsterdam Marriott hotel opening that year.

In 1976, Marriott opened two Great America Theme Parks but sold to Six Flags in 1984.

In these first several decades, Marriott International owned and managed many of the hotels within its portfolio. In 1993, the company decided to spin off the real estate ownership operations as a new company, Host Marriott, while retaining hotel management services under the Marriott International company name.

By 1999, there were over 360 Marriott Hotels & Resorts in 47 countries, and in November 2010, Marriott Hotels & Resorts announced the opening of what is said was their 500th property, the Pune Marriott Hotel & Convention Centre, in Pune, India.
In September 2005, Marriott Hotels & Resorts unveiled its first new room designs in ten years. Dubbed "mSpot," the new rooms feature clean lines and updated technology.

In August 2020 Marriott announced it was ending its Make A Green Choice program.

In October 2020, the UK data privacy watchdog fined Marriott Hotels £18.4 million for a serious data breach that exposed the millions of the companies customer's data to cyber-criminals.

Accommodations

Historical

From 2015

Location of international properties

Location of properties in the US

Controversies

Manager Resignations
In March 2012, the regional manager of Marriott South England, Robbie DaFlower was caught posting images of rotten meat on Twitter. This sparked discussion amongst users and promptly resulted in his termination, after it had been found that the rotting meat was sourced from the Marriott's own kitchens, having been left rotten for the express purpose of the prank.

Data Breaches
In July 2022, The Marriott Hotel revealed that the company's data had been breached. Hackers were able to compromise the hotels data which led to 20GB of data which included internal documents and information in addition to consumer data such as credit card information. The hackers broke into a server at the Marriott hotel at Baltimore-Washington International Airport. The group shared screenshots of customer information and were in contact with the Hotel chain. This Data breach marks the third data breach for the company in the last 4 years.

See also
 Marriott Syracuse Downtown
 Marriott World Trade Center
 Marriott Marquis

References

External links 

 Marriott Hotels and Resorts

Marriott International brands
Companies based in Washington, D.C.